Mohamed Al-Aywan (born 16 June 1971) is a Lebanese weightlifter. He competed in the 1988 Summer Olympics.

References

1971 births
Living people
Weightlifters at the 1988 Summer Olympics
Lebanese male weightlifters
Olympic weightlifters of Lebanon
20th-century Lebanese people